Ping Shan Tin Shui Wai Public Library is a Hong Kong public library. It is located in Ping Shan Tin Shui Wai Leisure and Cultural Building, on 1 Tsui Sing Road, Tin Shui Wai near MTR Tin Shui Wai station and Light Rail Tin Shui Wai stop. It serves the Ping Shan and Tin Shui Wai neighbourhoods, both administratively in the Yuen Long District, the New Territories.

It is managed by the Hong Kong Public Libraries under the Leisure and Cultural Services Department. It is also the first and only library in Hong Kong to date to have outdoor reading areas. There are about 330,000 books within the library's collection.

History
The library opened on 28 February 2013. It replaced an interim district library, called the Tin Shui Wai Public Library, which was housed in leased accommodation at Kingswood Ginza.

See also
 List of libraries in Hong Kong

References

Tin Shui Wai
Ping Shan
Public libraries in Hong Kong
Libraries in Hong Kong
Libraries established in 2013